Branko Belačić (26 October 1929 – 16 March 2008) was a Croatian rower. He competed in the men's eight event at the 1952 Summer Olympics.

References

1929 births
2008 deaths
Croatian male rowers
Olympic rowers of Yugoslavia
Rowers at the 1952 Summer Olympics
Sportspeople from Zagreb